Live Is Beautiful is a live EP by Sixx:A.M., side project of Mötley Crüe's Nikki Sixx, released both with the deluxe edition of The Heroin Diaries Soundtrack and separately, on November 25, 2008. The EP was recorded live during various performances of the band during Mötley Crüe's Crüe Fest in the summer of 2008.

Track listing

Personnel

Sixx: A.M.  
Nikki Sixx - bass guitar, backing vocals
DJ Ashba - lead guitar, backing vocals
James Michael - lead vocals, rhythm guitar, keyboards
Additional musicians
Tony Palermo - drums, percussion

References

2008 EPs
Hard rock EPs
Live EPs
2008 live albums
Sixx:A.M. albums
Eleven Seven Label Group EPs